Wronger than wrong is a statement that equates two errors when one of the errors is clearly more wrong than the other. It was described by Michael Shermer as Asimov's axiom. The mistake was discussed in Isaac Asimov's book of essays The Relativity of Wrong as well as in a 1989 article of the same name in the Fall 1989 issue of the Skeptical Inquirer:

Asimov explained that science is both progressive and cumulative. Even though scientific theories are later proven wrong, the degree of their wrongness attenuates with time as they are modified in response to the mistakes of the past. For example, data collected from satellite measurements show, to a high level of precision, how the Earth's shape differs from a perfect sphere or even an oblate spheroid or a geoid. 

Shermer stated that being wronger than wrong is actually worse than being not even wrong (that is, being unfalsifiable).

According to John Jenkins, who reviewed The Relativity of Wrong, the title essay of Asimov's book is the one "which I think is important both for understanding Asimov's thinking about science and for arming oneself against the inevitable anti-science attack that one often hears – [that] theories are always preliminary and science really doesn't 'know' anything."

See also
 False equivalence
 False balance
 Lie-to-children
 Not even wrong
 Toy model
 Verisimilitude

References

English phrases
Philosophy of science
Scientific terminology
Pejorative terms